Minnesota State Highway 197 (MN 197) is a  highway in northwest Minnesota, which runs from its first interchange with U.S. Highways 2 and 71 on the southeast edge of Bemidji and continues north and then west to its second interchange with U.S. Highways 2 and 71 on the northwest edge of Bemidji.

The route passes through the heart of the city of Bemidji.

Highway 197 is also known as Washington Avenue, Bemidji Avenue, and Paul Bunyan Drive at various points throughout its route.

Route description
Highway 197 serves as a north–south and an east–west business route through the city of Bemidji.  The roadway functions essentially as a business route for U.S. Highways 2 and 71.

Highway 197 passes in between Lake Irving and Lake Bemidji on the south side of the city.

History
Highway 197 was originally numbered 2 and 71 as part of old U.S. Highways 2 and 71 through the city of Bemidji.

In the mid 1980s, the new Highway 2 / 71 four-lane bypass of Bemidji was constructed.  The original route through the city was renumbered 197 at this time.

The original route through Bemidji (now 197) had been paved by the 1930s.

197 had been marked as "Highway 197 Thru City" on both ends.  In 2004, the new signs no longer read "Thru City".

Major intersections

References

197
Transportation in Beltrami County, Minnesota
Bemidji, Minnesota
U.S. Route 2
U.S. Route 71